John Charles "Barney" Solomon (11 February 1883 – 27 June 1952) was a British rugby union player who competed as captain for Great Britain in the 1908 Summer Olympics at White City Stadium, London. He also played for Redruth R.F.C. He was captain of the British rugby union team, which on 26 October 1908 won the Olympic silver medal for Great Britain.

See also

Cornish rugby

References

1883 births
1952 deaths
Cornish rugby union players
Rugby union players at the 1908 Summer Olympics
Olympic rugby union players of Great Britain
Olympic silver medallists for Great Britain
England international rugby union players
Medalists at the 1908 Summer Olympics